Hilbert Wildlife Management Area is located in Lincoln County near Sod, West Virginia, less than forty-five minutes drive south of Charleston, the state capital.

From Charleston, follow U.S. Route 119/WV Route 214 to Alum Creek, then follow WV Route 214 west through Sod to Joes Creek Road.  Follow Joes Creek Road north to the Hilbert WMA.

Hunting 

Hunting opportunities, though limited by the small size of Hilbert WMA, can include deer, fox, grouse, and squirrel.

Camping is not permitted in the WMA.

See also
Animal conservation
Fishing
Hunting
List of West Virginia wildlife management areas

References

External links
 West Virginia DNR District 5 Wildlife Management Areas
West Virginia Hunting Regulations
West Virginia Fishing Regulations

Wildlife management areas of West Virginia
Protected areas of Lincoln County, West Virginia
IUCN Category V